Robert Earl Vines (February 25, 1897 – October 18, 1982) was an American professional baseball pitcher. In 5 career games, he had a 0–0 record with a  9.82 ERA. He batted and threw right-handed.

Vines was born in Waxahachie, Texas and died in Orlando, Florida.

External links

1897 births
1982 deaths
St. Louis Cardinals players
Philadelphia Phillies players
Baseball players from Texas
People from Waxahachie, Texas
Griffin Lightfoots players